Marianne Maury Kaufmann or Maury-Kaufmann is a French writer. She is the author of Varsovie-Les Lilas, Pas de chichis! and Dédé, enfant de bastard.

References

 
 

Year of birth missing (living people)
Living people
21st-century French writers
21st-century French women writers